The Arthur S. Flemming Award is an award given annually to federal government employees. More than 500 individuals have received the award since it was created in 1948. The Trachtenberg School of Public Policy & Public Administration of The George Washington University administers the award. A nomination requires the person to be a federal employee for at least three years and for less than fifteen years. Every year twelve awards are given in five different categories: Leadership and/or Management, Legal Achievement, Social Science, Clinical Trials and Translational Research, Applied Science and Engineering, and Basic Science. 

Federal Agencies are encouraged to nominate outstanding public servants who meet the nomination requirements. Previously nominated individuals include such noted public servants as  Gretchen Campbell for pioneering accomplishments in the emerging field of atomtronics; and Fern Hunt recognized for a sustained record of fundamental contributions to probability, stochastic modelling, and other fields.

The awards are given to the annual winners at the George Washington University through its Trachtenberg School of Public Policy and Public Administration, which since 1997 has worked in partnership with the Arthur S. Flemming Awards Commission.

Noted recipients
(Non exhaustive list)
 Jean Apgar
Neil Armstrong
 David A. Bray
 Samuel Broder
 Gretchen Campbell
 George R. Carruthers
 John Chancellor
 Francis S. Collins
 Sen. Elizabeth Dole
 Anthony Fauci
 Deborah S. Jin
 Robert Gates
 Jun Ye
 Bruce Herschensohn
 Ivy Hooks
 Robert Hormats
 Fern Hunt
 Sherwood B. Idso
 George Khoury
 Kent Kresa
Rep. Howard Mosby
 Sen. Daniel Patrick Moynihan
 Elaine Surick Oran
 Christa Peters-Lidard
 William Daniel Phillips
 Paul Volcker, Jr.
 Welcome W. Wilson, Sr.

References

https://tspppa.gwu.edu/arthur-s-flemming-awards 
https://tspppa.gwu.edu/history-arthur-s-flemming-awards

External links 
Arthur S. Flemming Awards

American awards
1948 establishments in the United States